The World's Most Extraordinary Homes is a British documentary miniseries presented by Piers Taylor and Caroline Quentin and is broadcast on BBC Two. The series was also picked up by Netflix between March 2018 and July 2022.

Synopsis
The documentary miniseries follows award-winning architect Piers Taylor and actress and property developer Caroline Quentin, who explore a range of architect-designed houses in both extreme locations around the world, and around various countries.

The first series focused on houses built in challenging surroundings, and how they were designed to respond to these environments. The second series focused on one country per episode, and traveled to different destinations in each nation.

Each episode is themed and named according to the houses' environments or location. To explore how the designs function both as works of architecture and as real houses, the hosts stay overnight, eat meals and spend time in the homes.

Cast
 Piers Taylor
 Caroline Quentin

Episodes

Season one

Season two

Gallery

References

External links

2017 British television series debuts
2010s British documentary television series
BBC Television shows
BBC high definition shows
English-language television shows
Television series by Warner Bros. Television Studios